For Once in My Life is an album by American vocalist Sylvia Syms recorded in 1967 and released on the Prestige label.

Reception

Allmusic awarded the album 3 stars stating "The renditions are mostly pretty brief and instantly forgettable. Not one of Sylvia Syms' more significant sets".

Track listing 
 "Vaya con Dios" (Inez James, Buddy Pepper, Larry Russell) – 4:05   
 "Who (Will Take My Place)?" (Charles Aznavour, Herbert Kretzmer) – 3:20   
 "You Don't Have to Say You Love Me" (Pino Donaggio, Vito Pallavicini, Vicki Wickham, Simon Napier-Bell) – 2:52  
 "You Don't Know What Love Is" (Gene de Paul, Don Raye) – 4:07   
 "Games That Lovers Play" (Larry Kusic, James Last, Günter Loose, Eddie Snyder) – 2:50   
 "For Once in My Life" (Ron Miller, Orlando Murden) – 2:45   
 "Solitaire" (Steve Allen, Erroll Garner) – 1:55   
 "Yesterday" (Lennon–McCartney) – 3:15   
 "I Will Wait for You" (Jacques Demy, Norman Gimbel, Michel Legrand) – 2:26   
 "Don't Take Your Love from Me" (Henry Nemo) – 3:00  
Recorded at Van Gelder Studio in Englewood Cliffs, New Jersey on March 9, 1967 (tracks 1, 5 & 9) and April 18, 1967 (tracks 2–4, 6–8 & 10)

Personnel 
Sylvia Syms – vocals
Jerome Richardson – flute, alto flute (tracks 1, 5 & 9)
Johnny "Hammond" Smith – organ 
Gene Bertoncini (tracks 1, 5 & 9), Bucky Pizzarelli (tracks 1, 5 & 9), Thornel Schwartz (tracks 2–4, 6–8 & 10) 
– guitar
Sam Bruno (tracks 1, 5 & 9), Charles Wellsley (tracks 2–4, 6–8 & 10) – bass  
Bobby Rosengarden (tracks 1, 5 & 9), John Harris (tracks 2–4, 6–8 & 10) – drums
Richie "Pablo" Landrum – congas (tracks 2–4, 6–8 & 10)

References 

1967 albums
Prestige Records albums
Sylvia Syms (singer) albums
Albums recorded at Van Gelder Studio
Albums produced by Cal Lampley